Tomosynthesis, also digital tomosynthesis (DTS), is a method for performing high-resolution limited-angle tomography at radiation dose levels comparable with projectional radiography. It has been studied for a variety of clinical applications, including vascular imaging, dental imaging, orthopedic imaging, mammographic imaging, musculoskeletal imaging, and chest imaging.

History
The concept of tomosynthesis was derived from the work of Ziedses des Plantes, who developed methods of reconstructing an arbitrary number of planes from a set of projections. Though this idea was displaced by the advent of computed tomography, tomosynthesis later gained interest as a low-dose tomographic alternative to CT.

Reconstruction
Tomosynthesis reconstruction algorithms are similar to CT reconstructions, in that they are based on performing an inverse Radon transform. Due to partial data sampling with very few projections, approximation algorithms have to be used. Filtered back projection and iterative, expectation-maximization algorithms have both been used to reconstruct the data.

Reconstruction algorithms for tomosynthesis are different from those of conventional CT because the conventional filtered back projection algorithm requires a complete set of data. Iterative algorithms based upon expectation maximization are most commonly used, but are  computationally intensive. Some manufacturers have produced practical systems using off-the-shelf GPUs to perform the reconstruction in a few seconds.

Differences from other imaging modalities
Digital tomosynthesis combines digital image capture and processing with simple tube/detector motion as used in conventional computed tomography (CT). However, though there are some similarities to CT, it is a separate technique. In modern (helical) CT, the source/detector makes at least a complete 180-degree rotation about the subject obtaining a complete set of data from which images may be reconstructed. Digital tomosynthesis, on the other hand, only uses a limited rotation angle (e.g., 15-60 degrees) with a lower number of discrete exposures (e.g., 7-51) than CT. This incomplete set of projections is digitally processed to yield images similar to conventional tomography with a limited depth of field. Because the image processing is digital, a series of slices at different depths and with different thicknesses can be reconstructed from the same acquisition. However, since fewer projections are needed than CT to perform the reconstruction, radiation exposure and cost are both reduced.

Applications

Breast 
Digital breast tomosynthesis (DBT) is Food and Drug Administration (FDA) approved for use in breast cancer screening. The benefit for screening has been debated, but consensus is being reached that the technology is improving sensitivity compared to two-view digital mammography at the cost of a slightly reduced specificity (increased recall rates). Because the data acquired are 85 - 160 micron typical resolution, much higher than CT, DBT is unable to offer the narrow slice widths that CT offers (typically 1-1.5 mm). However, the higher resolution detectors permit very high in-plane resolution, even if the Z-axis resolution is less. Another interesting property of breast tomosynthesis is that image quality may vary substantially through the imaging volume.

Photon-counting breast tomosynthesis has been investigated, and spectral imaging applications, such as breast density measurement and lesion characterization, have been investigated on that platform.

Chest

Musculoskeletal imaging
Tomosynthesis has a much more limited depth of field than does CT. For this reason, it likely will not be able to replace CT for the evaluation of the deeper organs of the body. However, since bones are often near the skin, multiple musculoskeletal applications of tomosynthesis have been studied, most of which have mostly been used in research with limited use in everyday practice.

Evaluation of fractures
Tomosynthesis has been compared to both radiography and CT for the evaluation of healing fractures, especially in the presence of hardware. In a study of patients with wrist fractures, digital tomosynthesis was shown to enable detection of more fractures than radiography while simultaneously providing lower metal artifact than radiography.

Evaluation of erosions in rheumatoid arthritis
Tomosynthesis has been compared to digital radiography, with CT as the standard, for the detection of erosions associated with rheumatoid arthritis. The radiation dose of digital tomosynthesis was very close to that of digital radiography. However, tomosynthesis showed sensitivity, specificity, accuracy, positive predictive value, and negative predictive value of 80%, 75%, 78%, 76%, and 80%, compared to digital radiography were 66%, 81%, 74%, 77%, and 71%. The slight benefit digital tomosynthesis in this application may or may not justify the slightly increased cost of the modality compared to digital radiography.

Electronics
Tomosynthesis is also used for x-ray inspection of electronics, particularly printed circuit board assemblies and electronic components. Tomosynthesis is usually used where a CT slice is required at high magnification, where conventional CT would not allow the sample to be located close enough to the x-ray source.

References

External links
Digital Tomosynthesis: Advanced Breast Cancer Imaging Technique, by Max Wiedmann, UCSB

X-ray computed tomography
Breast cancer